Kandilli is a neighbourhood of Üsküdar, Istanbul, Turkey.

It lies on the Asian bank of Bosphorus and is home to some of Istanbul's in-city forests. The Kandilli Anatolian High School for Girls was one of the first girl's high schools in Ottoman Turkey. The Kandilli Observatory, a facility of Boğaziçi University, is dedicated mostly to earthquake science. The Kandilli Earthquake Museum is located within the campus.

The mosque was badly damaged by fire on 15 November 2020, caused by a short circuit.

References

Neighbourhoods of Üsküdar